Francisco María de Paula Téllez-Girón y Benavides (Madrid, 11 March 1678 – Paris, 3 April 1716), 6th Duke of Osuna, 6th Marquess of Peñafiel, 10th Count of Ureña, was a Spanish noble, diplomat and a Grandee of Spain.

Biography 
He was the first surviving son of Gaspar Téllez-Girón, 5th Duke de Osuna, and his second wife, Ana Antonia de Benavides Carrillo y Toledo, Marquise of Caracena and Countess of Pinto. He inherited the titles of Chief Notary of the Kingdom of Castile (Notario mayor del reino) and Chief Waiter of the King (Camarero mayor del Rey) upon the death of his father in 1694. He also became the sixth Duke of Osuna. He served as Gentleman of the Chamber of King Carlos II of Spain.

On 12 December 1700, he welcomed and made the corresponding obeisances to the new sovereign Philip V of Spain at the Spanish-French border and accompanied the new King on his travel to Madrid. He became a trusted man of Philip V and followed him during his travels in Catalonia and Italy.

At the end of 1711, the King elected him Ambassadeur extraordinaire and first Plenipotentiary for the Congress of Utrecht. He traveled to Utrecht and accompanied by the Duke of Berwick and the Marquis of Monteleón, he signed the Treaty of Utrecht on 13 July 1713. Likewise, he also negociated and signed the peace between Spain and Portugal on 16 February 1715.

The Duke would now be assigned as Ambassador to the Court of Paris, but he died there on 13 April 1716, at just 38 years of age.
He had married María del Pilar y del Rosario Remigia, only daughter of Íñigo Melchor de Velasco, 7th Duke of Frías.
As the marriage only produced 2 daughters, he was succeeded by his younger brother José Maria.

Sources 
Real Academia de la Historia.

1678 births
1716 deaths
House of Osuna
Téllez-Girón family
110
106
106
Spanish diplomats
Grandees of Spain